The AFC Asian Cup qualification is the process that a national association football team goes through to qualify for the final tournament of AFC Asian Cup. The qualification reduces the large field of eligible entrants from 47 to just 24 for the finals.

The hosts receive automatic berths, and between 1972 to 2015 (except 1976), so did the defending champions.

Format evolution 

Over the past century, the AFC Asian Cup has seen various changes in its qualification format as well as the number of teams participating.

1956 
The 19 teams were divided in to three different zones based upon their location. In each zone, the teams played in a two legged Knockout format. The four winners of first round advanced to the next round. The two winners in the second round advanced to final which decided the team participating in the final tournament along with the hosts.

1960–1972 
From 1960, the format had a slight change. The participating teams were again divided into zones based upon their location. The teams in their zones played against each other once, in a round robin format. The group topper of each zone advanced to the final tournament along with the hosts.

1972–1980 
Starting from 1972, the format saw another change. Instead of zones, the teams were now divided into groups, with two teams instead of one advancing to the final tournament along with the hosts. Also the number of teams participating in the final tournament was increased to six and then to ten in 1980.

1984 & 1988 
For a brief period, the teams were divided into groups not based on their location. This saw teams from all zones competing against each other in Asian Cup qualifiers for the first time since its inception. Two teams from each group qualified for the final tournament, along with the winners of previous edition who received a direct entry and as well as the hosts.

1992–2000 
The format was reverted to an older one where teams were segregated based upon their location, but this time the number of participating nations increased. Winners of previous edition and the hosts were joined by the winner of each groups in qualifiers. The number of participants in the final tournament was increased to 12.

2004 & 2007 
The tournament started from the preliminary round where the lower ranked teams played against each other, the winners of this round qualified for the qualifying round. In the qualifying round, top two teams from each group qualified for the final tournament. Participation of teams in the final tournament increased from 12 to 16.

2011 & 2015 
The hosts, previous edition's winners, runner-up and third placed sides automatically qualified for the final tournament. AFC Challenge Cup winners(2) were also awarded a slot in the final tournament. The remaining ten slots were decided by the qualifying tournament in which the lower ranked teams played in preliminary rounds and the winners advanced to the qualifying round. In the qualifying round, the top two teams from each group received a berth in the final tournament.

2019–present 
The proposal to merge the preliminary qualification rounds for FIFA World Cup qualifiers with those for the Asian Cup was ratified by the AFC Competitions Committee.

The tournament was expanded to 24 teams from previous number of 16.

The qualification structure is as follows:
First round: A total of 12 teams (teams ranked 35–46) played home-and-away over two legs. The six winners advanced to the second round.
Second round: A total of 40 teams (teams ranked 1–34 and six first round winners) were divided into eight groups of five teams to play home-and-away round-robin matches.
The eight group winners and the four best group runners-up advanced to the third round of FIFA World Cup qualification as well as qualified for the AFC Asian Cup finals.
The next 16 highest ranked teams (the remaining four group runners-up, the eight third-placed teams and the four best group fourth-placed teams) advanced directly to the third round of Asian Cup qualification.
The remaining 12 teams entered the play-off round to contest the remaining eight spots in the third round of Asian Cup qualification.
Play-off round: At a Competition Committee meeting in November 2014, it was decided that a play-off round of qualifying would be introduced into the qualification procedure. There were two rounds of home-and-away two-legged play-off matches to determine the final eight qualifiers for the third round.
Third round: The 24 teams were divided into six groups of four to play home-and-away round-robin matches, and they competed for the remaining slots of the AFC Asian Cup.

The play-off round represented a change from the initially announced qualification format – which saw the remaining fourth-placed teams and the four best group fifth-placed teams also advance to the third round.

Participating teams 

Only teams that played at least one match are considered for the purposes of first appearance. Teams that withdrew prior to the qualification, or that qualified to the AFC Asian Cup by walkover due to other teams' withdrawals, are not considered.

Teams' entries prior to their actual debuts in qualification

Successor and renamed teams

Summary 

The table is accurate as of 2023 qualification.

Teams that have never qualified for the finals tournament and droughts

See also
 AFC Women's Asian Cup qualification
 AFC Women's Olympic Qualifying Tournament
 FIFA World Cup qualification
 FIFA Women's World Cup qualification
 UEFA European Championship qualifying
 UEFA Women's Championship qualifying
 CONCACAF Gold Cup qualification

Notes

References

External links
AFC Asian Cup Official Website
AFC Asian Cup, AFC.com
Asian Nations Cup, RSSSF archive
Asian Nations Cup - All-Time Tables and Final Placings, RSSSF archive